Lizard Head is a mountain summit in the San Miguel Mountains range of the Rocky Mountains of North America.

Mountain
Lizard Head lies just southeast of a group of three Colorado fourteeners, Mount Wilson, Wilson Peak, and El Diente Peak.  Lizard Head is only the 556th highest peak in Colorado by most standard definitions,
but its towering spire-like form makes it one of the most spectacular.

Lizards Head Trail climbs west from Trout Lake along Black Face Mountain ridge and past the south face of Lizard Head toward Wilson Peak.

The peak was used in a logo by the Rio Grande Southern Railroad.

Geology
The rock spire of Lizard Head looks like an old eroded volcanic plug but it is actually composed of extrusive volcanic ash flows of Oligocene age resting on older sedimentary rocks of Eocene age.

Climbing
Lizard Head is one of the most difficult summits in Colorado to climb.
The story of the first ascent makes a memorable and harrowing tale. In the words of Albert Ellingwood:

Despite the serious and daunting objective hazards, the first ascent team completed the climb and descent safely in a feat of mountaineering skill.

Appearance
The appearance of the peak is reported to have changed significantly due to a landslide in 1911. From the December 29 edition of the Mancos Times-Tribune of that year:

There are several photographs of the peak from before the landslide. Before-and-after photographs taken from the north and shown in The RGS Story  indicate substantial change. The earlier photograph shows a taller squared-off peak that would be more suggestive of a lizard's head.

Before-and-after photos shown in Jackson and Fielder's Colorado 1870-2000  taken from the south do not show as much change in appearance, indicating that the area of collapse was on the northern side.

Historical names
Lizard Head 
Lizard Head Peak
Lizards Head

See also
List of Colorado mountain ranges
List of Colorado mountain summits
List of Colorado fourteeners
List of Colorado 4000 meter prominent summits
List of the most prominent summits of Colorado
List of Colorado county high points

References

External links

  
 

Mountains of Colorado
Mountains of Dolores County, Colorado
Mountains of San Miguel County, Colorado
North American 3000 m summits
San Juan Mountains (Colorado)
San Juan National Forest
Uncompahgre National Forest
Tephra
Oligocene volcanism
Volcanism of Colorado